The Guelph Storm are a major junior ice hockey team based in Guelph, Ontario, Canada. They have played in the OHL since the 1991–92 season. The team plays home games at the Sleeman Centre.

History
The franchise started as the Toronto Marlboros, who moved to Hamilton to become the Dukes of Hamilton in 1989. Following the 1990–91 season, the franchise was relocated to Guelph and a contest was held to name the team. Tom Douglas submitted the winning entry "Storm" and the team was renamed the Guelph Storm.

The first year in Guelph was dismal, but the building process for Guelph was soon successful. The Storm finished first place in the 1994–95 season. General Manager Mike Kelly was voted the OHL Executive of the Year and Craig Hartsburg voted the Coach of the Year for the Canadian Hockey League and the Ontario Hockey League. Draft picks from the early years in Guelph include Jeff O'Neill and Todd Bertuzzi.

Guelph reached the OHL finals in 1995 and 1996. The team qualified for the 1996 Memorial Cup by playing against the Memorial Cup host Peterborough Petes in the OHL final.

The Storm won their first J. Ross Robertson Cup in 1998. This success continued into the Memorial Cup Tournament as the Storm rallied to the Championship Game where they lost to the Portland Winter Hawks in overtime in the final game.

In the year 2000, the team moved from the historic but aging Guelph Memorial Gardens into the Guelph Sports and Entertainment Centre (since renamed the Sleeman Centre). The Storm were selected to host the 2002 Memorial Cup tournament. It marked the team's third appearance in the national junior championship, their first as host team.

Two years later, the Storm won their second OHL Championship, and returned to the 2004 Memorial Cup hosted in Kelowna, British Columbia.

In the 2008 NHL Entry Draft, defenceman Drew Doughty was selected 2nd overall by the Los Angeles Kings, the highest ever selection of a Guelph Storm player.

In 2014, the Storm captured their third OHL Championship, and subsequently advanced to the 2014 Memorial Cup final, hosted in London, Ontario. The Edmonton Oil Kings won Cup championship on 25 May 2014 with a 6-3 win over the Storm.

In late April 2019, the team captured the Wayne Gretzky Trophy as 2019 OHL Western Conference Champions again winning the J. Ross Robertson Cup. On 12 May 2019, in the sixth game of the finals, the Storm defeated the Ottawa 67's to win the OHL championship and were again headed to the Memorial Cup, their sixth appearance, to start on 17 May in Halifax. Nick Suzuki (a Montreal Canadiens prospect) earned the Wayne Gretzky 99 Award as OHL Playoff MVP. He was the third Storm player in the team's history to win this award.

In 2021,the team agreed to stop using the song Cotton Eye Joe by the group Rednex during games after consultation with local groups alleging the song has racist origins.

Championships
The Guelph Storm have appeared in the Memorial Cup tournament six times, won the J. Ross Robertson Cup four times, won the Hamilton Spectator Trophy four times, and have won five division titles.

Memorial Cup
 1996 Finished in 4th place
 1998 Lost to Portland Winter Hawks
 2002 Finished in 4th place
 2004 Finished in 4th place
 2014 Lost to Edmonton Oil Kings
 2019 Lost to Rouyn-Noranda Huskies

J. Ross Robertson Cup
 1995 Lost to Detroit Jr. Red Wings
 1996 Lost to Peterborough Petes
 1998 OHL Champions vs. Ottawa 67's
 2004 OHL Champions vs. Mississauga IceDogs
 2014 OHL Champions vs. North Bay Battalion 
 2019 OHL Champions vs. Ottawa 67's

Wayne Gretzky Trophy
 2003–04, Western Conference Champions
 2013–14, Western Conference Champions
 2018–19, Western Conference Champions

Hamilton Spectator Trophy
1994–95 47 W, 14 L, 5 T, 99 points
1995–96 45 W, 16 L, 5 T, 95 points
1997–98 42 W, 17 L, 6 T, 1 OTL, 91 points
2013–14 52 W, 12 L, 4 OTL, 108 points

Division Trophies
1994–95 Emms Trophy, Central Division
1995–96 Emms Trophy, Central Division
1997–98 Emms Trophy, Central Division
1998–99 Holody Trophy, Midwest Division
2013–14 Holody Trophy, Midwest Division

Head coaches
Guelph Storm head coaches have been awarded the Matt Leyden Trophy as the OHL coach-of-the-year twice in team history. Craig Hartsburg was awarded the Matt Leyden Trophy for the 1994–95 season, and was also voted the Canadian Hockey League coach-of-the-year the same year. Dave Barr won the Matt Leyden Trophy in 2005–06.

List of coaches with multiple seasons in parentheses.

General managers
A Guelph Storm executive has won the OHL Executive of the Year on two occasions while the honour was awarded from 1990–2013. General manager Mike Kelly won the award in 1994–95 and team governor Rick Gaetz won the award in 2009–10.

List of General Managers with multiple seasons in parentheses.
1991–1997 – Mike Kelly (12)
1997–2003 – Alan Millar (6)
2003–2008 – Dave Barr (5)
2009–2010 – Jason Brooks
2010–2016 – Mike Kelly
2017–present – George Burnett (6)

Players

Award winners
1991-92 – Jeff O'Neill, Jack Ferguson Award (First Overall draft pick)
1992–93 – Jeff O'Neill, Emms Family Award (Rookie of the Year)
1993–94 – Jeff O'Neill, CHL Top Draft Prospect Award
1994–95 – Jamie Wright, Bobby Smith Trophy (Scholastic Player of the Year)
1994–95 – Mark McArthur and Andy Adams, Dave Pinkney Trophy (Lowest team GAA)
1994–95 – Mike Kelly, OHL Executive of the Year
1995–96 – Dan Cloutier and Brett Thompson, Dave Pinkney Trophy (Lowest team GAA)
1995–96 – Brett Thompson, F.W. 'Dinty' Moore Trophy (Best rookie GAA)
1995–96 – Jeff Williams, William Hanley Trophy (Most Sportsmanlike Player)
1997–98 – Manny Malhotra, Bobby Smith Trophy (Scholastic Player of the Year)
2000–01 – Craig Anderson, OHL Goaltender of the Year
2000–01 – Dustin Brown, Bobby Smith Trophy (Scholastic Player of the Year)
2001–02 – Dustin Brown, Bobby Smith Trophy (Scholastic Player of the Year)
2002–03 – Dustin Brown, Canadian Hockey League Scholastic Player of the Year and Bobby Smith Trophy (Scholastic Player of the Year)
2003–04 – Martin St. Pierre, Leo Lalonde Memorial Trophy (Overage Player of the Year)
2003–04 – Martin St. Pierre, Wayne Gretzky 99 Award (Playoffs MVP)
2005–06 – Ryan Callahan, Leo Lalonde Memorial Trophy (Overage Player of the Year)
2007–08 – Drew Doughty, Max Kaminsky Trophy (Most Outstanding Defenceman)
2008–09 – Tim Priamo, Roger Neilson Memorial Award (Top Academic College/University Player)
2009–10 – Taylor Beck, Jim Mahon Memorial Trophy (Top Scoring Right Winger)
2009-10 – Rick Gaetz, OHL Executive of the Year
2010–11 – Matej Machovsky, F.W. 'Dinty' Moore Trophy (Best rookie GAA)
2013–14 – Robby Fabbri, Wayne Gretzky 99 Award (Playoffs MVP)
2013–14 – Adam Craievich, Ivan Tennant Memorial Award (Top Academic High School Student)
2013–14 – Matt Finn, Mickey Renaud Captain's Trophy (Leadership Award)
2014–15 – Justin Nichols, Roger Neilson Memorial Award (Top Academic College/University Player)
2015-16 – Ryan Merkley, Jack Ferguson Award (First overall draft pick)
2016–17 – Quinn Hanna, Ivan Tennant Memorial Award (Top Academic High School Student)
2016–17 – Garrett McFadden, Dan Snyder Memorial Award (OHL Humanitarian of the Year)
2016–17 – Ryan Merkley, Emms Family Award (Rookie of the Year)
2017–18 – Garrett McFadden, Dan Snyder Memorial Award (OHL Humanitarian of the Year)
2018–19 – Isaac Ratcliffe, Mickey Renaud Captain's Trophy (Leadership Award)
2018–19 – Nick Suzuki, Wayne Gretzky 99 Award (Playoffs MVP)
2018–19 – Nick Suzuki, William Hanley Trophy (Most Sportsmanlike Player)
2018–19 – Zack Terry, Ivan Tennant Memorial Award (Top Academic High School Student)
2019–20 – Nico Daws, OHL Goaltender of the Year
2021-22 – Cameron Allen, Emms Family Award (Rookie of the Year)

NHL alumni

Honoured numbers
List of numbers retired/honoured by the Guelph Storm.
18 – Paul Fendley (retired)
24 – Ryan Callahan
44 – Todd Bertuzzi
92 – Jeff O'Neill

Hall of Famers
No former Guelph Storm members are currently in the Hockey Hall of Fame.

Season-by-season results

Regular season
Legend: OTL = Overtime loss, SL = Shootout loss

Playoffs
1991–92 – Out of playoffs.
1992–93 – Lost to Detroit Jr. Red Wings 4 games to 1 in first round.
1993–94 – Defeated London Knights 4 games to 1 in division quarter-finals. Lost to S.S.Marie Greyhounds 4 games to 0 in division semi-finals.
1994–95 – First place in OHL. Earned first round bye. Defeated Owen Sound Platers 4 games to 0 in quarter-finals. Defeated Belleville Bulls 4 games to 0 in semi-finals. Lost to Detroit Jr. Red Wings 4 games to 2 in finals.
1995–96 – First place in OHL. Earned first round bye. Defeated Niagara Falls Thunder 4 games to 0 in quarter-finals. Defeated Belleville Bulls 4 games to 1 in semi-finals. Lost to Peterborough Petes 4 games to 3 in finals.  Finished 4th place in Memorial Cup hosted by Peterborough Petes.
1996–97 – Defeated Erie Otters 4 games to 1 in division quarter-finals. Defeated S.S. Marie Greyhounds 4 games to 2 in quarter-finals. Lost to Ottawa 67's 4 games to 3 in semi-finals.
1997–98 – First place in OHL. Earned first round bye. Defeated Sudbury Wolves 4 games to 0 in quarter-finals. Defeated Plymouth Whalers 4 games to 0 in semi-finals. Defeated Ottawa 67's 4 games to 1 in finals. OHL CHAMPIONS Finished round-robin portion of Memorial Cup in 2nd place. Defeated Spokane Chiefs 2–1 (OT) in semi-finals. Lost to Portland Winter Hawks 4–3 (OT) in finals. Finished 2nd place in Memorial Cup.
1998–99 – Defeated Erie Otters 4 games to 1 in conference quarter-finals. Lost to Owen Sound Platers 4 games to 2 in conference semi-finals.
1999–2000 – Lost to Plymouth Whalers 4 games to 2 in conference quarter-finals.
2000–01 – Lost to Brampton Battalion 4 games to 0 in conference quarter-finals.
2001–02 – Defeated Kitchener Rangers 4 games to 0 in conference quarter-finals. Lost to Windsor Spitfires 4 games to 1 in conference semi-finals. Finished round-robin portion of Memorial Cup tied for third place. Lost to Victoriaville Tigres 4–3 in tiebreaker game. Finished 4th place as hosts of Memorial Cup.
2002–03 – Defeated Sarnia Sting 4 games to 2 in conference quarter-finals. Lost to Kitchener Rangers 4 games to 1 in conference semi-finals.
2003–04 – Defeated Owen Sound Attack 4 games to 3 in conference quarter-finals. Defeated Plymouth Whalers 4 games to 0 in conference semi-finals. Defeated London Knights 4 games to 3 in conference finals. Defeated Mississauga Ice Dogs 4 games to 0 in finals. OHL CHAMPIONSFinished 4th place in Memorial Cup hosted by Kelowna Rockets.
2004–05 – Lost to London Knights 4 games to 0 in conference quarter-finals.
2005–06 – Defeated Saginaw Spirit 4 games to 0 in conference quarter-finals. Defeated Plymouth Whalers 4 games to 2 in conference semi-finals. Lost to London Knights 4 games to 1 in conference finals.
2006–07 – Lost to Plymouth Whalers 4 games to 0 in conference quarter-finals.
2007–08 – Defeated London Knights 4 games to 1 in conference quarter-finals. Lost to S.S. Marie Greyhounds 4 games to 1 in conference semi-finals.
2008–09 – Lost to Saginaw Spirit 4 games to 0 in conference quarter-finals.
2009–10 – Lost to London Knights 4 games to 1 in conference quarter-finals.
2010–11 – Lost to Saginaw Spirit 4 games to 2 in conference quarter-finals.
2011–12 – Lost to Plymouth Whalers 4 games to 2 in conference quarter-finals.
2012–13 – Lost to Kitchener Rangers 4 games to 1 in conference quarter-finals.
2013–14 – Defeated Plymouth Whalers 4 games to 1 in conference quarter-finals. Defeated London Knights 4 games to 1 in conference semi-finals Defeated Erie Otters 4 games to 1 in conference finals. Defeated North Bay Battalion 4 games to 1 in finals.  OHL CHAMPIONS  Finished round-robin portion of Memorial Cup in 1st place. Lost to Edmonton Oil Kings 6–3 in finals. Finished 2nd place in Memorial Cup
2014–15 – Defeated Owen Sound Attack 4 games to 1 in conference quarter-finals. Lost to S.S. Marie Greyhounds 4 games to 0 in conference semi-finals.
2015–16 – Out of playoffs.
2016–17 – Out of playoffs.
2017–18 – Lost to Kitchener Rangers 4 games to 2 in conference quarter-finals.
2018–19 — Defeated Kitchener Rangers 4 games to 0 in conference quarter-finals. Defeated London Knights 4 games to 3 in conference semi-finals. Defeated Saginaw Spirit 4 games to 3 in conference finals. Defeated Ottawa 67's 4 games to 2 in finals. OHL CHAMPIONS  Finished round-robin portion of Memorial Cup in 2nd place. Lost to Rouyn-Noranda Huskies 6–4 in semifinals. Finished 3rd place in Memorial Cup
2019–20 – Cancelled.
2020–21 – Cancelled.
2021–22 – Lost to Sault Ste. Marie Greyhounds 4 games to 1 in conference quarter-finals.

Uniforms and logos
For the 2007/08 season, the team switched to a crimson and white colour scheme with the same logo that was on the last jerseys, except the "stripes" that appear across the "belly" of the Storm logo itself were modified from black to crimson. The white jersey has "STORM" written on top of the logo, and the crimson jersey has "GUELPH" above the logo. The new shoulder patches, featuring the alternate "GS" logo, have been redesigned and are meant to be read from the inside (the "G") outward (the "S").

The Guelph Storm primary logo is one of the team's mascots "Spyke" surrounded by a twister with the team name above it. The team colours are white, grey, crimson and black. Home jerseys have a white background with "STORM" above the logo, and away jerseys have a crimson background with "GUELPH" above the logo.

The previous Guelph Storm logo was used from 1991 to 1995. The team colours then were white, blue, grey and black. Home jerseys had a white background and away jerseys had a blue background.

Arenas
The Guelph Storm played at the Guelph Memorial Gardens from 1991 until the year 2000 when moving to the new Guelph Sports and Entertainment Centre, since renamed the Sleeman Centre. The GSEC was built into what was a former Eaton's department store in a downtown shopping mall. The GSEC hosted the 2001 Hershey Cup and the 2002 Memorial Cup.

See also
List of ice hockey teams in Ontario

References

External links

www.guelphstorm.com Guelph Storm Official web site

 
Ontario Hockey League teams
Sport in Guelph
Ice hockey clubs established in 1991
1991 establishments in Ontario